Psychrobacter lutiphocae is a Gram-negative, aerobic oxidase- and catalase-positive, non-spore-forming, nonmotile bacterium of the genus Psychrobacter, which was isolated from the faeces of a seal in Schleswig-Holstein in Germany.

References

External links
Type strain of Psychrobacter lutiphocae at BacDive -  the Bacterial Diversity Metadatabase

Moraxellaceae
Bacteria described in 2009